The 1935 Oregon State Beavers football team represented Oregon State University in the Pacific Coast Conference (PCC) during the 1935 college football season.  In their third season under head coach Lon Stiner, the Beavers compiled a 6–4–1 record (2–3–1 against PCC opponents), finished in seventh place in the PCC, and outscored their opponents, 175 to 100.  The team played its home games at Bell Field in Corvallis, Oregon.

Schedule

Roster
HB Joe Gray, So.

References

Oregon State
Oregon State Beavers football seasons
Oregon State Beavers football